TPV may refer to:

 Tampereen Pallo-Veikot, Finnish football club
 Temporary protection visa, document issued to refugees by Australia 
 Thermophotovoltaic, conversion of heat to electricity by a photovoltaic process
Thermoplastic Vulcanizate (thermoplastic elastomer), a material which both heat-moldable and elastic
 Third-party verification, confirmation by a third party of a transaction between two parties
 Tactical Protector Vehicle, a version of the Plasan Sand Cat sold by Oshkosh Defense
 TPV Technology, a Hong Kong-based electronics company
 The People's Voice (internet TV station) (2013–2014), an Internet television station founded by David Icke
 Today's Persian Version, see Bible translations into Persian